William Benton North Evans (January 18, 1882 – July 21, 1967) was a Canadian politician. He served in the Legislative Assembly of New Brunswick as member of the Progressive Conservative party from 1925 to 1935 and 1939 to 1944.

References

1882 births
1967 deaths
Politicians from Fredericton
Progressive Conservative Party of New Brunswick MLAs
20th-century Canadian politicians